Lieutenant-General Sir John Hudson KCB (1833 – 8 June 1893) was a British officer in the British Indian Army.

Military career
Educated at the Royal Naval School, New Cross, Hudson was commissioned into the 64th Regiment of Foot in 1853. He served as deputy assistant adjutant-general during the response to the Indian Mutiny.

He commanded six companies of the 28th Punjab Infantry in 1879 during the Second Anglo-Afghan War and later commanded the Indian contingent during the Second Suakin Expedition in 1885. He went on to be commander of the Rohilkhand brigade of the Bengal Army in 1886, the Quetta division of the Indian Army in 1888 and the Allahabad division of the Bengal Army in 1889. He became Commander-in-Chief Bombay Army in April 1893 but was killed just two months later by a fall from his horse in June 1893.

References

Sources

 

1833 births
1893 deaths
British Indian Army generals
North Staffordshire Regiment officers
Punjab Regiment officers
British military personnel of the Indian Rebellion of 1857
British military personnel of the Second Anglo-Afghan War
British Army personnel of the Mahdist War
Knights Commander of the Order of the Bath
People educated at the Royal Naval School